Saperda robusta is an extinct species of beetle in the family Cerambycidae, that existed in what is now Germany during the Upper Pliocene. It was described by Schmidt in 1967.

References

†
Fossil taxa described in 1967
Extinct beetles